The Hong Kong Tennis Classic (formerly known as the JB Group Classic and the Watsons Water Champions Challenge) is a women's exhibition tennis tournament held (with temporary stands) in Victoria Park, Hong Kong, in the first week of January.  It is a warm-up tournament for the Australian Open.

Formerly, the tournament was played under a more traditional format, with 8 players invited to participate, who would play against each other in a round robin format (with two groups of 4 players), with the top two players from each group progressing to the final.  However, in 2009, the tournament switched to a group format, with four Zonal groups of three players; Team Americas, Team Asia-Pacific, Team Europe and Team Russia.  Two teams play against each other in a semifinal, with three singles ties (amongst the three players) and 1 doubles tie.  The two winning teams progress to the Gold Group final, playing for 1st and 2nd, whilst the losing teams progress to the Silver Group final, playing off for 3rd and 4th.

Past finals

See also
 List of tennis tournaments
Hong Kong Open (for men)

External links
 
 Official website

Tennis tournaments in Hong Kong
Exhibition tennis tournaments